Vichare is an Indian surname. Notable people with the surname include:

 Anshuman Vichare (born 1975), Indian actor, producer, and television personality
 Rajan Vichare (born 1961), Indian politician
 Pratap Tukaram Vichare (born 1 November, 1945), awarded India Independent Ceremony by the Government Of India

Indian surnames